The 15 cm/45 41st Year Type was a British naval gun designed by the Elswick Ordnance Company for export in the years before World War I that armed warships of the Imperial Japanese Navy.  These guns served aboard Japanese ships during World War I and as coastal artillery during World War II.

History 
The 15 cm/45 41st Year began life as a design produced by the parent company of Elswick, Armstrong Whitworth for export customers and called the Pattern GG.  These guns did not serve aboard ships of the Royal Navy.  On 5 October 1917 the Japanese designation system for artillery changed from inches 6 in/45 41st Year Type to centimeters 15 cm/45 41st Year Type.  Whether the guns originated in Britain or were built in Japan they still shared the same 41st Year designation.

Construction 
The 15 cm/45 41st Year was constructed of an A tube and wire wound with a protective outer jacket.  Ships built in British shipyards for Japan were armed with Pattern GG guns and later Japan produced their own versions under license at the Kure Naval Arsenal.  Four different models were produced at Kure which differed in the style of rifling used.  Although sometimes referred to as QF guns, they were actually BL guns which used separate loading bagged charges and projectiles.

Naval use 
15 cm/45 41st Year guns equipped armored cruisers, predreadnought battleships and protected cruisers of the Imperial Japanese Navy.

Armored cruisers
 Tsukuba-class cruisers -  The two ships of this class had a secondary armament of twelve EOC Pattern GG guns in single casemated mounts amidships.
 Japanese cruiser Aso - This ship was the former Bayan of the Imperial Russian Navy sunk and captured at Port Arthur in 1905.  The ship was repaired and recommissioned into the Imperial Japanese Navy in 1908 as the Aso.  The Bayan's secondary armament of eight single casemated 152 mm 45 caliber Pattern 1892 guns were replaced with eight EOC Pattern GG guns.

Predreadnought battleships
 Kawachi-class battleships - The two ships of this class had a secondary armament of ten 15 cm/45 41st Year guns in single casemated mounts amidships.
 Japanese battleship Aki - This ship had a secondary armament of eight 15 cm/45 41st Year guns in single casemated mounts amidships.
 Japanese battleship Kashima - This ship had a secondary armament of ten EOC Pattern GG guns in single casemated mounts amidships.
 Japanese battleship Mikasa - This ship had a secondary armament of fourteen 15 cm/45 41st Year guns in single casemated mounts amidships after a 1908 refit.

Protected cruisers
 Chikuma-class cruisers - The three ships of this class had a primary armament of six 15 cm/45 41st Year guns.  There was one single shielded mount fore and aft, and three shielded mounts per side in sponsons amidships.
 Japanese cruiser Tsugaru - This ship was the former Pallada of the Imperial Russian Navy sunk and captured at Port Arthur in 1905.  The ship was repaired and recommissioned into the Imperial Japanese Navy in 1908 as the Tsugaru.  The Pallada's primary armament of eight 152 mm 45 caliber Pattern 1892 guns were replaced with eight 15 cm/45 41st Year guns.

Ammunition
Ammunition was of separate loading bagged charge and projectile.

The gun was able to fire:
 Armor-piercing
 Common

Photo Gallery

References

Notes

External links
 http://www.navweaps.com/Weapons/WNJAP_6-45_EOC.php
 http://navalhistory.flixco.info/H/125881x54503/8330/a0.htm

Naval guns of Japan
Naval guns of the United Kingdom
World War I naval weapons
World War II naval weapons
152 mm artillery